The 1920 Campeonato Gaúcho was the second season of Rio Grande do Sul's top association football league. Guarany de Bagé won the title for the first time.

Format 

The championship was contested by the four regional champions in a single round-robin system, with the team with the most points winning the title.

Qualified teams 

The regional championships were also contested by Nacional from São Leopoldo and Juventude from Caxias do Sul (first region), Ideal from Pelotas and São Paulo from Rio Grande (second region) and 14 de Julho from Santana do Livramento. Guarany from Cruz Alta, being the only club from the third region affiliated to the Rio Grande do Sul's FA, was invited to participate, but did not answer the invitation.

Championship

References 

Campeonato Gaúcho seasons
1920 in Brazilian football leagues